"Remember" is a popular song about nostalgia by Irving Berlin, published in 1925. The song is a popular standard, recorded by numerous artists.

In the lyric, Berlin uses an interesting poetic technique by extending the sound of the word "forgot" into "forget me not" then placing the original word (forgot) and the base form of its opposite (remember) at the end of the next two lines:

Remember we found a lonely spot,
And after I learned to care a lot,
You promised that you'd forget me not,
But you forgot
To remember.

Film appearances
Alexander's Ragtime Band (1938) - performed by Alice Faye
Moontide (1942) - instrumental 
So This Is Love (1953) - sung by Kathryn Grayson
There's No Business Like Show Business (1954) - sung by the cast and later by Ethel Merman and Dan Dailey
Isn't It Shocking? (1973) Unknown vocalist, orchestrated by David Shire.

Recorded versions
Betty Carter
The Ray Conniff Singers (Young at Heart LP)
Bing Crosby included the song in a medley on his album On the Sentimental Side (1962) and he also recorded it for the album Bing Crosby's Treasury - The Songs I Love (1968 version).
Cliff Edwards
John Fahey (instrumental)
Michael Feinstein and Liza Minnelli
Ella Fitzgerald
Benny Goodman (instrumental)
Erskine Hawkins
Billie Holiday
Julie London
Hank Mobley (instrumental)
Moon Mullican and the Modern Mountaineers
Red Norvo (instrumental)
Joshua Redman (instrumental)
Patrice Rushen
Dinah Shore in the medley: 'Remember / All Alone / Always'
Frank Sinatra
Andy Williams
Thelonious Monk (Instrumental)
Wes Montgomery (Instrumental)
Sarah Vaughan and Billy Eckstine (1957)
Erroll Garner

References

Songs about nostalgia
1925 songs
1925 singles
Songs written by Irving Berlin
Liza Minnelli songs
Andy Williams songs